Michiko Okada (born 11 January 1945) is a Japanese professional golfer who played on the LPGA of Japan Tour (JLPGA).

Okada won 10 times on the JLPGA between 1975 and 1995. One of Ohsako's JLPGA wins was co-sanctioned with the LPGA Tour, the 1978 Mizuno-Japan Classic.

Professional wins

LPGA of Japan Tour wins (10)
1975 (1) Lake Towada International Women's Open
1976 (1) Taisetsu Women's Open
1977 (1) Miyagi TV Cup Women's Open
1978 (1) Mizuno-Japan Classic (co-sanctioned with LPGA Tour)
1981 (1) West Sea National Park Women's Open
1983 (1) Hiroshima Women's Open
1986 (1) UCC Ladies
1989 (1) Mitsubishi Electric Infantas Ladies
1992 (1) Kosaido Asahi Golf Cup 
1995 (1) Daio Paper Elleair Women's Open

LPGA Tour wins (1)

LPGA Tour playoff record (1–0)

Team appearances
Professional
Handa Cup (representing World team): 2006, 2007, 2008, 2009

References

External links

Japanese female golfers
LPGA of Japan Tour golfers
Sportspeople from Fukushima Prefecture
1945 births
Living people